Corporate Air was an airline based in Billings, Montana, United States. It has since ceased operations in its Manila, Philippines base. It was established in 1995 and operates airbridge and feeder services between Subic and Davao City, with stops in Manila and Cebu City on behalf of FedEx. It also operates scheduled passenger services. In the past, it flew passengers between Manila and Baguio.  Its main base was Subic Bay International Airport. Corporate Air Inc. ceased all Philippine operations in 2008.

Destinations 
Corporate Air operated services to the following destinations
Caticlan (Godofredo P. Ramos Airport)
Manila (Ninoy Aquino International Airport) - main hub
Subic (Subic Bay International Airport) - FedEx employees only

Fleet 

The Corporate Air fleet consists of the following aircraft (at March 2007):

Previously operated
3 Cessna 208 Caravan
1 Beechcraft King Air 200

At January 2005 the airline also operated:
2 De Havilland Canada DHC-6 Twin Otter 300
3 Cessna 208A Caravan I
1 Dornier 228-200

References

External links
Corporate Air

Defunct airlines of the Philippines
Airlines established in 1995
Airlines disestablished in 2008
Philippine companies established in 1995